Online help is topic-oriented, procedural or reference information delivered through computer software. It is a form of user assistance. The purpose of most online help is to assist in using a software application, web application or operating system. However, it can also present information on a broad range of subjects. Online help linked to the application's state (what the user is doing) is called Context-sensitive help.

Benefits
Online help has largely replaced live customer support. Before its availability, support could only be given through printed documentation, postal mail, or telephone (which is expensive).

Customers may find when troubleshooting their own problems, they can get to a solution by themselves, saving time and money. More companies can afford this kind of help system, allowing them to compete with the larger companies more effectively.

Platforms

Online help is created using help authoring tools or component content management systems. It is delivered in a wide variety of formats, some proprietary and some open-standard, including:
Hypertext Markup Language (HTML), which includes HTML Help, HTML-based Help, JavaHelp, and Oracle Help
Adobe Portable Document Format (PDF)

Online help is also provided via live chat systems, one step removed from telephone calls. This allows the support person to conduct several support sessions simultaneously, thus reducing costs. The transcript is immediately available and can be sent to the customer after the session ends.

The chat feature also reduces the intense negativity that can be directed at customer support personnel, requiring the customer to calm down and articulate their thoughts more clearly.

DITA and DocBook
The Open Source tool DocBook XSL can also generate help files and is a resource for single source publishing.  From one source, DocBook can generate PDF, JavaHelp, WebHelp, eBook and many more formats (even .chm files if required). The same with DITA, which is even favored for that purpose.

Microsoft help platforms
Microsoft develops the platforms for delivering help systems in the Microsoft Windows operating system.

Other platforms

See also
Balloon help
Darwin Information Typing Architecture
DocBook
Frequently Asked Questions
List of help authoring tools
Microsoft Assistance Markup Language (Microsoft AML) 
Web help
help desk

References